Vasily Yakovlevich Sitnikov (August 19, 1915, Novo-Rakitino, Tambov Governorate - November 28, 1987, New York) was a Russian painter. He was one of the most vivid "landmark" figures of the post-war Soviet Nonconformist Art of Russia, and a living legend in Moscow artistic milieu.

Biography 
He was arrested by the Soviet authorities in 1941, barely escaped summary execution and was later committed to a mental asylum in Kazan. He survived harsh conditions and starvation and was released shortly before the end of World War II.

Formally, Sitnikov's works are based on the traditional system of academic studies of nude nature and elaborate graphic shading. His nudes, however, acquired surrealistic eroticism, and his shadings created rippling airy covers enveloping forms like snowy mist, marshland fog, or haze of light. In addition to that, he employed the characteristic features of 'Russian style' in the spirit of Symbolism and modern.

The artist was also keen on teaching arts. His system involved methods of epatage and  paradox. A whole range of artists (V.G. Veisberg, Y. A. Vedernikov, M. D. Sterligova, A. V. Kharitonov, Evelina Brozgul, etc.) were associated – by direct studying or creative contacts – with 'the school of Sitnikov'.

In 1975 Sitnikov emigrated to Austria. He lived for five years in Kitzbühel, Tyrol where he painted his masterpiece "An ancient Russian monastery defiled by a Communist propaganda center; It's winter and snow is falling". In 1980 Sitnikov immigrated to the United States. He lived in New York City until his death in 1987. He was not commercially successful abroad, though his works were displayed in prestigious museums, such as New York Museum of Modern Art (MoMA), and others.

In 2002 Andrei Zagdansky produced a feature-length documentary Vasya about life and art of Vasily Sitnikov.

In 2007 a LiveAuctioneers.com buyer paid a record price for Vasily Sitnikov painting of $496,900.

On May 24, 2009 a major personal exhibition of artist's works opened in the "Our Artists" gallery in Moscow.

External links 
Dazzling Lantern of Vasily Sitnikov
"Vasya", a feature documentary about Vasily Sitnikov 

1915 births
1987 deaths
People from Lebedyansky Uyezd
Soviet painters
Soviet emigrants to Austria
Austrian emigrants to the United States